The Violet Line was a boundary line agreed between the United Kingdom and the Ottoman Empire in March 1914. It started from the termination of the Blue Line agreed to at the Anglo-Ottoman Convention of 1913 and extended to the border between the Ottoman Yemen Vilayet and the British Aden Protectorates. Together with the Blue Line, the Violet Line effectively divided the Arabian peninsula in two.

References

Further reading
Anscombe, Frederick F. The Ottoman Gulf: the creation of Kuwait, Saudi Arabia, and Qatar New York: Columbia University Press, 1997.
Kelly, J. B. Eastern Arabian Frontiers New York: Frederick A Praeger, 1964.
Kelly, J. B. Sovereignty and Jurisdiction in Eastern Arabia International Affairs (Royal Institute of International Affairs) 34.4 (1958): 16-24.
Hurewitz, J. C., ed. The Middle East and North Africa in World Politics: A Documentary Record, 2nd edn. Vol. 1: European Expansion, 1535-1914. New Haven: Yale University Press, 1975, pp.567-570. 
Schofield, Richard. Kuwait and Iraq: Historical and Territorial Disputes. London: Chatham House, 1991.
Slot, B. J. Mubarak al-Sabah: Founder of Modern Kuwait 1896-1915. Arabian Publishing Ltd, 2005.
Tallon, James N. "Allies and Adversaries: Anglo-Ottoman Boundary Negotiation in the Middle East, 1906–1914" in Justin Q. Olmsted Britain in the Islamic World Imperial and Post-Imperial Connections London: Palgrave, 2019, 89-105.
Wilkinson, John C. Arabia’s Frontiers: The Story of Britain’s Boundary Drawing in the Desert, London: I.B. Taurus & Co Ltd, 1991, 100-108.

Borders of Yemen
1914 in the Ottoman Empire
Ottoman period in Yemen
Ottoman Empire–United Kingdom relations